Craig Charleston (born 8 May 1970) is a Scottish football referee.

References

External links
SoccerBase

1970 births
Living people
Scottish football referees
Scottish Football League referees
Scottish Premier League referees
Scottish Professional Football League referees